The 1932 United States Senate election in California was held on November 2, 1932. Incumbent Republican Senator Samuel Morgan Shortridge ran for a third term in office, but lost a highly competitive four-way Republican primary to Tallant Tubbs, who ran as a "wet" or anti-prohibition candidate.

In the general election, former Secretary of the Treasury and presidential candidate William Gibbs McAdoo won a three-way race against Tubbs and Prohibition candidate Robert P. Shuler, who received the most votes of any Prohibition candidate in United States history.

Republican primary

Candidates
Joe Crail, U.S. Representative from Inglewood
Samuel Morgan Shortridge, incumbent Senator
Robert P. Shuler, Southern Methodist evangelist preacher (cross-filing)
Tallant Tubbs, state legislator
Leo V. Youngworth

Results

Democratic primary

Candidates
P.M. Abbott
Annie Hale
William Gibbs McAdoo, former U.S. Secretary of the Treasury and candidate for President in 1920 and 1924
M. J. McCarthy
Robert P. Shuler, Southern Methodist evangelist preacher (cross-filing)
Justus S. Wardell, nominee for Governor in 1926

Results

General election

Results

See also 
  1932 United States Senate elections

References 

1932 California elections
California
1932